On February 26, 2020, a mass shooting occurred at the Molson Coors Beverage Company in Milwaukee, Wisconsin, United States, at approximately 2:10 pm. The perpetrator, 51-year-old Anthony Ferrill, shot and killed five coworkers before committing suicide. It is believed to be one of only two public mass shootings to occur in the U.S. in all of 2020, with the other occurring at Springfield, Missouri, in March and leaving five people dead, including the gunman.

Shooting 
Milwaukee police responded to reports of a shooting at the company just before 2:10 pm, and the incident was handled as an active shooter situation. The company used Twitter to announce the situation just before 2:30 pm, they also emailed a local newspaper that the shooter was located in or near the second-floor stairwell of Building 4. Following the shooting, agents with the Bureau of Alcohol, Tobacco, Firearms and Explosives (ATF) were dispatched to the scene, while a number of nearby schools and businesses were placed on lockdown.

The victims were male employees at the brewery, aged 33 to 61.

Perpetrator 
The shooter was identified as 51-year-old Anthony Ferrill. He worked as an electrician for more than 20 years, spending about 17 of those at the Milwaukee campus. In 2015, a noose was placed in Ferrill's locker. However, the police have not confirmed a motive for the shooting. He died of a self-inflicted gunshot wound at the scene, according to police.

Reactions 
The CEO of Molson Coors wrote an email to all of the company's employees, in which he expressed his condolences.

Milwaukee Mayor Tom Barrett described the shooting as a tragic day for the city and the state. Other politicians, such as House Speaker Nancy Pelosi and Senators Ron Johnson and Tammy Baldwin, issued statements about the shooting, with some highlighting gun control stances along with condolences.

President Donald Trump extended his condolences to those affected by the "wicked murderer" who had wounded and killed a number of people.

See also 
 List of homicides in Wisconsin
 Workplace violence

References

 

2020 in Wisconsin
2020 mass shootings in the United States
2020 murders in the United States
2020s in Milwaukee
21st-century mass murder in the United States
Attacks on buildings and structures in 2020
Attacks on buildings and structures in the United States
Crime in Milwaukee
February 2020 crimes in the United States
February 2020 events in the United States
Mass murder in 2020
Mass murder in Wisconsin
Mass shootings in the United States
Mass shootings in Wisconsin
Murder in Wisconsin
Workplace shootings in the United States
2020 active shooter incidents in the United States